Michael Mills may refer to:

Michael Mills (journalist) (1927–2008), Irish ombudsman and journalist
Michael Mills (English cricketer) (1921–2014), English cricketer
Michael Mills (West Indian cricketer) (born 1967), West Indian cricketer
Michael P. Mills (born 1956), U.S. federal judge
Mick Mills (born 1949), English footballer
Michael Mills (make-up artist), nominated for Best Makeup and Hairstyling
Michael Mills (Canadian producer) (born 1942), Canadian short film director
Michael Mills (British producer) (1919–1988), British television comedy producer
Mike Mills (born 1958), R.E.M. bass guitarist
Mike Mills (director) (born 1966), American film and music video director
 "Mike Mills", a song by Air from the 2004 album Talkie Walkie